Vice Admiral Sir David George Steel,  (born 6 April 1961) is a retired senior Royal Navy officer who served as Second Sea Lord between 2012 and 2015. He assumed the office of Governor of Gibraltar on 11 June 2020.

Early life
Steel was born on 6 April 1961. He was educated at Rossall School in Lancashire and attended Durham University where he read law, graduating in 1983. He was called to the bar in 1988.

Military career
Steel joined the Royal Navy in 1979. His early career was spent in a variety of sea and shore appointments, including as the Fleet Legal Adviser. In December 1999, while serving in the aircraft carrier , he was awarded a Queen's Commendation for Valuable Service in support of operations in Kosovo and Macedonia earlier that year. In November 2005 he assumed command of HM Naval Base Portsmouth and in that capacity was honoured for his "inspirational leadership" during the Government's savings review of Naval Bases in 2007. He was also appointed Chief Naval Logistics Officer and Aide-de-Camp to Her Majesty The Queen.

In November 2008 Steel was appointed Director of Service Personnel Policy (Pay and Allowances) at the Ministry of Defence and, in April 2010, he was promoted to rear admiral and appointed Naval Secretary. He was promoted to vice admiral and appointed Second Sea Lord in October 2012.

Already a Commander of the Order of the British Empire (CBE), Steel was appointed a Knight Commander of the Order of the British Empire (KBE) in the 2015 New Year Honours. He was appointed a Knight of the Order of St John (KStJ) on 11 November 2020.

Later professional life
In 2011 Steel was appointed as a Director of Portsmouth Cultural Trust, a role he held until 2016. In 2015 he became Chief Executive of the Leeds Castle Foundation and Enterprises Limited. He is a Deputy Lieutenant of Hampshire, a Freeman of the City of London, and a Bencher of the Middle Temple.

Among his other commitments Steel is a trustee of the Nuffield Trust for the Forces of the Crown, and President and Chairman of Trustees of the Union Jack Club. 
He is President of the Church of England Soldiers', Sailors' and Airmen's Clubs and Housing Association, Patron of the Boleh Sailing Trust, a vice-president of the Marine Society & Sea Cadets, and an ambassador for the Woodland Trust.

Steel assumed the role of Governor of Gibraltar on 11 June 2020.

References

External links

|-

 
|-

1961 births
Living people
Governors of Gibraltar
Royal Navy vice admirals
Knights Commander of the Order of the British Empire
Knights of Grace of the Order of St John
Recipients of the Commendation for Valuable Service
Deputy Lieutenants of Hampshire
People educated at Rossall School
Alumni of Grey College, Durham
English lawyers
Royal Navy logistics officers